Patrick Etshimi Kindenge (born 26 February 1989), commonly known as Patrick Etshimi, is a Congolese professional footballer, who plays for Championnat National 2 side Aubervilliers.

Career
Etshimi was under contract at FC MK Etanchéité. Before 2009 he played for AS Dragons, and in 2009 for Vita Club (probably, on loan). In August 2009, he was on trial with Charleroi in Belgium.

He made his Russian Premier League debut on 13 March 2010 for PFC Spartak Nalchik in a game against FC Anzhi Makhachkala. His loan was terminated during the 2010 summer transfer window.

In July 2017, Etshimi joined French club Paris FC on a contract that would run until 2018.

In July 2019, he signed with French club SC Bastia on a contract that would run until 2022.

In June 2020, Etshimi agreed a move to US Lusitanos Saint-Maur.

References

External links
 
 

1989 births
Living people
Association football forwards
Democratic Republic of the Congo footballers
FC MK Etanchéité players
AS Dragons players
AS Vita Club players
PFC Spartak Nalchik players
US Roye-Noyon players
AS Poissy players
AC Amiens players
US Ivry players
Entente SSG players
Paris FC players
Stade Lavallois players
FC Chambly Oise players
FC Progrès Niederkorn players
SC Bastia players
US Lusitanos Saint-Maur players
FCM Aubervilliers players
Russian Premier League players
Ligue 2 players
Championnat National players
Championnat National 2 players
Championnat National 3 players
Luxembourg National Division players
Democratic Republic of the Congo expatriate footballers
Expatriate footballers in Russia
Democratic Republic of the Congo expatriate sportspeople in Russia
Expatriate footballers in France
Democratic Republic of the Congo expatriate sportspeople in France
Expatriate footballers in Luxembourg
Democratic Republic of the Congo expatriate sportspeople in Luxembourg